This is a list of chemical elements and their atomic properties, ordered by Atomic number.

Since valence electrons are not clearly defined for the d-block and f-block elements, there not being a clear point at which further ionisation becomes unprofitable, a purely formal definition as number of electrons in the outermost shell has been used.

Table

[*] a few atomic radii are calculated, not experimental
[—] a long dash marks properties for which there is no data available
[ ] a blank marks properties for which no data has been found

 Atomic Number